The permeases are membrane transport proteins, a class of multipass transmembrane proteins that allow the diffusion of a specific molecule in or out of the cell in the direction of a concentration gradient, a form of facilitated diffusion. 

The permease binding is first step of translocation. LacY protein from Escherichia coli is an example of a permease.

See also

 Lactose permease
 Beta-galactoside permease
It was originally discovered in the 1930s by Joy Adames. It is a transporter protein that helps in various aspects of cellular life including DNA replication, translation of RNA, and diffusion.
 Amino acid permease
A permease (porter) is a protein or protein complex that catalyzes a vectorial reaction, irrespective of whether or not it also catalyzes a chemical or electron transfer reaction that drives the vectorial process.

References

External links
 

Transport proteins
Transmembrane proteins